Adam Sahaba is a town and union council of Sadiqabad Tehsil in the Rahim Yar Khan District of Pakistan. It is located at 28°21'50N 70°11'40E and lies between Sadiqabad and Rahim Yar Khan – the tehsil and district capitals respectively. Noteworthy locations in the area include Shrine of Adam Sahaba, with one of the largest graveyards in the Rahim Yaar Kahn district. Saraiki language speakers form an ethnic majority, and the Culture of Sindh is predominant.

References

Populated places in Rahim Yar Khan District
Union councils of Rahim Yar Khan District